Japan was the host nation for the 1972 Winter Olympics in Sapporo.  It was the first time that Japan had hosted the Winter Olympic Games, but second time overall after the 1964 Summer Olympics in Tokyo. It was also the first Winter Olympic Games held in Asia. The host nation sent 90 athletes, consisting of 70 men and 20 women, along with 20 officers. The flag bearer for the Japanese team, Mineyuki Mashiko did not participate in the game, but instead held the position of team manager.

Three Japanese ski jumpers swept the medals in the normal hill event, becoming national heroes. This achievement also made Yukio Kasaya the first gold medalist for Japan at the Winter Olympic Games. He was also the first ever Asian to win a Winter Olympic gold medal.

Medalists

| width=78% align=left valign=top |

| width=22% align=left valign=top |

Alpine skiing

Men

Men's slalom

Women

Biathlon

Men

 1 One minute added per close miss (a hit in the outer ring), two minutes added per complete miss.

Men's 4 x 7.5 km relay

 2 A penalty loop of 200 metres had to be skied per missed target.

Bobsleigh

Cross-country skiing

Men

Men's 4 × 10 km relay

Women

Women's 3 × 5 km relay

Figure skating

Men

Women

Pairs

Ice hockey

First round
Winners (in bold) entered the Medal Round. Other teams played a consolation round for 7th-11th places.

|}

Consolation round

Japan 3-3 Switzerland
Japan 3-2 Yugoslavia
Japan 4-5 Norway
Japan 7-6 West Germany

Luge

Men

(Men's) Doubles

Women

Nordic combined 

Events:
 normal hill ski jumping 
 15 km cross-country skiing

Ski jumping

Speed skating

Men

Women

References
Official Olympic Reports
International Olympic Committee results database
Japan Olympic Committee database
 Olympic Winter Games 1972, full results by sports-reference.com

Nations at the 1972 Winter Olympics
1972
Winter Olympics